Alice Elisabeth Kotelawala (née Attygalle), CBE was a Ceylonese businesswoman and philanthropist. She was the mother of Sir John Kotelawala, third Prime Minister of Ceylon.

She was born to Mudaliyar Don Charles Gemoris Attygalle, a wealthy land and mine owner and his wife Petronella Abeykoon, daughter of Fonseka Abeykoon. She was the eldest of four siblings. Her sister Lena married Colonel T. G. Jayewardene. Their son Major T. F. Jayewardene was a member of parliament, and Colonel Jayewardene's nephew J. R. Jayewardene became the President of Sri Lanka. Her youngest sister, Ellen, married F. R. Senanayake, a barrister and member of the Colombo Municipal Council. He initiated the Sri Lankan independence movement with his brother D. S. Senanayake, who became the first Prime Minister of Ceylon. Her only brother was Francis Dixon Attygalle.

She married John Kotelawala Sr, a police inspector against the wishes of her family. They had two sons, John Kotelawala and Justin Kotelawala and a daughter Freda, who married C. V. S. Corea. Her sons were Dr Gamani Corea and Vijaya Corea.

Mudaliyar Attygalle granted Alice Kotelawala a portion of his property and John Kotelawala Sr resigned from the police to manage Attygalle's estate. He was later forced out of the management of the Attygalle estates by the family. Kotelawala Snr started his own business ventures including the Ceylon-Japan Trading Company. In 1907, he was arrested and found guilty of conspiring to murder his brother-in-law, Francis Attygalle. While the murder trial was underway, Kotelawala Sr committed suicide by poisoning himself.

Kotelawala spent much of the remaining family funds on the legal defense of her husband. With her husband dead and her inheritance spent, she faced destitution. With the assistance of her brother-in-law F. R. Senanayake and sister Ellen, Kotelawala was able to rebuild the family wealth through careful management of their remaining land holdings and the share of the Kahatagaha graphite mine, which she received from her younger sister Ellen and brother-in-law. The Senanayakes assisted in the education of the Kotelawala children. 

Kotelawala had converted to Christianity and became heavily involved in social service. She was awarded a MBE in the 1939 Birthday Honours and a CBE in the 1951 Birthday Honours.

See also 
List of political families in Sri Lanka

References

External links
Mrs Alice Kotelawala 76 Year Old Mother Of Sir John Kotelawala The New Prime Minister Of Ceylon.

Ceylonese Commanders of the Order of the British Empire
Converts to Christianity
People from Colombo
People from British Ceylon
Sinhalese businesspeople
Sri Lankan Christians
Sri Lankan women in business
Year of birth missing
Year of death missing
Sri Lankan businesspeople